Sandalomenia is a genus of solenogaster, and the only genus in its family.

The type species is Sandalomenia papilligera Thiele, 1913

Species
 Sandalomenia carinata Thiele, 1913
 Sandalomenia papilligera Thiele, 1913

References

 Thiele, J. 1913. Antarktische Solenogastren. Dtsch. Sübpolar Expedition 14, Zool., 6(1): 35-65

Pholidoskepia